Adil Oralbekovich Zhalelov (born June 3, 1990, Leninskoye, Kazakh SSR), known professionally as Skriptonit is a Kazakh rapper, singer, songwriter and music producer. He is the founder of the music record label Musica36. In 2013 Skryptonite introduced himself to the music scene by dropping a video for his single “VBVVCTND”. A year and a half later he released his debut album “Dom S Normal’nuimi Yavleniyami” (English: House with Normal Phenomena), it became one of the most successful Russian-language rap albums of 2015.

In 2018, he split his work into two projects: Skryptonite and Gruppa Skryptonite.  As Adil himself explained, this distinction concerns not only the recording of songs, but also the atmosphere of concerts. Thus, Gruppa Skryptonite concerts are an eight-person music band and new arrangements, while Skryptonite concerts are a "rapper + DJ" format and perform to minusovki.

In 2021 it was announced that he is the most listened artist in the CIS.

Biography

Early years 
Adil Kulmagambetov was born on June 3, 1990 in the village of Leninsky near Pavlodar city in the Northeast of Kazakhstan, born to Oralbek Zhalelovich Kulmagambetov (born 1 September 1953). He began making music as a teenager, at 11 he became interested in rap, at 15 he began composing music. Claims to have changed his last name from Kulmagambetov to Zhalelov as a young man (listed as "Kulmagambetov" in the State Revenue Committee register).

First successes 
In 2009, Skriptonit, along with his friend Anuar Baimuratov (Niman), formed the band JILLZ. Besides them, the group consisted of Yuri Drobitko (Yurik Thursday), Sayan Zhimbaev (Truwer), Azamat Alpysbaev (Six O) and Aidos Dzhumalinov (Strong Symphony). Even before signing with Gazgolder, Skriptonit released several singles that became hits and managed to gain fans of his art, He also became famous as a performer of "real" trap-music. In 2013, Scriptonite, together with Niman, released the music video for the song "VBVVCTND"  After that, he was interested in Russian production center Gazgolder. On February 27, 2014, it was revealed that Scriptonite had become a resident of this label. Subsequently, Scriptonite stated that 2014 was the pivotal year in his life.

In 2015, he participated in the creation of a joint album Basta and Smokey Mo titled "Basta / Smokey Mo". The single "Cosmos", recorded with Dasha Charusha, topped the iTunes charts and was 22nd on The Flow's "50 Best Tracks of 2015". The music videos for the songs "Ice" and "Slumdog Millionaire" featuring Scriptonite garnered millions of views on YouTube The music video for the song "Slumdog Millionaire" was subsequently ranked #2 in the top "Best Russian Clips of 2015" by Rap.ru, and the song "Ice" was ranked #46 on The Flow's Top 50 Tracks of 2015. In October 2015, Scriptonite was among the finalists for the Jagermeister Indie Awards in the hip-hop category. In the summer of 2016, Scriptonite was among the contenders in the 2016 Discovery of the Year category of the popular men's magazine GQ.

2015. "House with Normal Phenomena" 
Skriptonite's debut album titled "House with Normal Phenomena" (allusion to the title of the movie "House with Paranormal Phenomena") was released on November 24 2015 and reached number two on the album chart iTunes, overtaking the album Gorgorod by Russian rapper Oxxxymiron and behind  new album by British singer Adele. Gazeta.Ru columnist Yaroslav Zabaluev noted that "in an hour and a half, Jalelov offers not just conceptual, atmospheric work, but also a fair amount of genre diversity, from trap and new York hip-hop to almost gospel.

"House with Normal Phenomena" became one of the most successful Russian rap albums of 2015, and Scriptonite himself was voted "rapper of the year" by online publication Colta.ru. "Dom..." made the list of "20 Best Albums of 2015" by Gazeta.Ru and was awarded sixth place in the "30 Best Albums of the Year" list by Afisha". The album took first place in the list of the best Russian-language albums according to Rap.ru and The Flow.

The video clip for the song "Style" took fifth place in the list of "Best Russian videos of 2015" according to Rap.ru, and the song itself ranked 15th on The Flow's Top 50 Tracks of 2015 list. In the same top spot, the song "Dance by Yourself" was ranked #3. Afisha included the video clip for the song "Priton" in the list of "100 Greatest Clips of 2015".

2016. Jillzay Band, GQ Awards 
Skriptonite's second album was originally scheduled to be released on the same day as his debut album. In an interview with Meduza Scriptonite assured that the almost finished album titled 3P (reads ) should be released in January 2016, but for unknown reasons, the album never appeared on the stated deadline. It later became known that Skryptonite's second studio album would be titled "Hotel Everest".

In September 2016, the Russian edition of the men's magazine GQ recognized Skryptonite as "Discovery of the Year".

On October 29, 2016, the band Jillzay, of which Scriptonite is listed as a member, released an 18-track album 718 Jungle. The performer took part in half of all songs.

2017-2018. "A Celebration on Street 36," Zorski Music Label and Ouroboros 
On March 7, 2017, the collective premiered the mini-album Open Season.

The second studio album was eventually titled "A Celebration on 36th Street". It was released on May 24, 2017. Hours before the album's release, the song "Outro" and a double video clip of Scriptonite - "Party" / Jillzay - "Bar '2 Lesbuchi". The presentation of the album was held on May 26, 2017, in the club A2 in St. Petersburg, at which Adil said that the release of the new album, which will have a different name, will still take place in the fall of 2017{not AI|28|05|2017}. In an interview with the editor-in-chief of "L'Officiel" Ksenia Sobchak, he clarified that the album with the title "Street 36", which is radically different from the previous ones and is dedicated to the performer's personal problems, will be a double album.

Soon it became known that the band Jillzay closed, and instead the music label Zorski was formed, which includes performers 104 (Yuri Drobitko), Truwer (Sayan Zhimbaev) and Benz (Altynbek Merkanov). In September, artists 104 and Truwer presented their collaborative solo album "Safari," on which Skriptonit appeared not only as a guest but also as an executive producer.

On December 16, 2017, Scriptonite released their third work - a double concept album Uroboros: Street 36 and Uroboros: Mirrors'. The title of the record refers to the mythical creature, the serpent uroboros. Adil Jalelov himself in an interview with Gazeta.Ru explained why the album has such a title: "... I realized that this is an image very close to me, combined with the meaning of my numbers - 36. Plus the image of the snake eating itself, the principle of self-improvement through self-destruction, is very close to me in many different ways". The presentation of the record took place on the same day in St. Petersburg at Club A2. On the day of the release, Zhalelov said in his Instagram broadcast that for him rap as a genre is outdated, in connection with which he takes a break in creativity, planning not to release large solo releases for 2–3 years.

 2018-present. Gruppa Skryptonite, Musica36, "2004" 
On August 9, 2018, Adil releases "the first story from Gruppa Skryptonite's new music project," titled "Stupid and Unnecessary". Notably, the music video for the track was not released on the "Gazgolder" channel, but on the band's own channel.

On October 24, 2018, the rap track "Multi-Brand", recorded with artists T-Fest, 104 and Niman, premiered. On the same day, the first episode of the second season of the show "GazLive" was released, with Adil as a guest. In the release, he revealed that he is returning to rap and is currently busy creating a new EP, which will mostly consist of tracks not included on "Ouroboros".

In 2019 Skriptonite, 104, Truwer and Dose formed Musica36. Five singles were released under this label in February–March: "It's Hot in Hell Today" (104 with Dose, Scriptonite), "Liquor Bath" (Dose) "Podruga" (Gruppa Skryptonite) "Sinsemilla" (104 with. Scriptonite, Vander Phil, Rigos), "Danced" (Dose with Andy Panda). A music video was filmed for the song "Podruga".

A live performance of the song "Podruga", and "Priton" and "Suka tashit nas na dno" on March 31 and April 1, respectively (other versions of songs released on the "House with Normal Phenomena" album).

On April 5, 2019, the released Solitude, Gruppa Skryptonite's debut mini album. The record includes 6 songs, including previously released singles "Glupye I Nenuzhnye" and "Podruga".

On June 28, 2019, Scriptonite released the maxi-single "Frozen," which included a joint song with Andy Panda, "Frozen," as well as a solo song, "Warm Up".

On December 24, 2019, Scriptonite released his fourth studio album, "2004", featuring Andy Panda, 104, Truwer, MDee and Ryda.

Scriptonite shared his thoughts on "2004" with Apple Music:

"I started writing this album a little over a year ago. I wasn't going to write a rap album, but nevertheless new songs were written and for some reason quite easily.

This is the first album that I wrote all the music on myself, even though on the other records most of the music was mine too. It doesn't have any narrative concept or storyline stretching from beginning to end, but it sounds solid and very special to me personally. Probably because it's almost all done with all sorts of analog synths and drum machines and sounds warm, like the 2000s.

For me, it's the first album that I can listen to in the background and not think about it being my record." 

On February 20, 2020, the artist's album 104, titled Cinema Without Cigarettes, was released. Adil took part in three songs: "Not Sorry" (with Miyagi), "Snow", and "Pipes" (with Saluki).

On November 13, 2020, Scriptonite and Niman released the joint EP "PVL is Back". It included 4 tracks recorded in the artists' typical style. The lyrics on the mini-album touch on drugs, wealth, relationships with girls, problems with enemies and the law.

 Musical style and reviews 
Skriptonit positions his work as "Kazakh rap" and disapproves of those who call him a "Russian performer" doing "Russian rap". His first lyrics were devoted to children's problems and school, then there was a short period of so-called "rap about rap", and he began to raise current topics in the early 2010s. In his songs, unlike other Russian-speaking rappers experimenting with "deep" lyrics, Skriptonit emphasizes the musical component, which he often does himself. The peculiar pronunciation, which is jokingly called "Yeltsin-floo", and "half-drunk" voice gave a unique sound for his debut album. In order to avoid other people's influence, Scriptonite practically does not listen to songs in Russian, including works by other rap artists

After the release of the album House with Normal Phenomena, famous rap singer Oxxxymiron praised Skryptonite's work, noting the high level of "musical frenzy and originality". Other musicians have also praised the album: Pencil (Denis Grigoryev), Johnyboy (Denis Vasilenko), ATL (Sergey Kruppov), Ivan Dorn, Guf (Alexei Dolmatov).

 Discography 

 Studio albums 
 2015 - "House with Normal Phenomena"
 2017 - "A Celebration on 36th Street"
 2017 - "Ouroboros: Street 36 / Mirrors"
 2019 - "2004"
 2021 - "Whistles and Papers"
 2021 - "Bad Habits" (with Indablack and qurt)

 Mini-albums 
 2017 - Open Season (with Jillzay)
 2019 - Solitude (with Gruppa Skryptonite)
 2019 - "Frozen"
 2019 - Don't Lie, Don't Believe (with 104)
 2020 - PVL is back (with Niman)

 Compilations 
 2015 - To You (with Gazgolder artists)
 2016 - 718 Jungle (with Jillzay)
 2019 - Musica36: How I Spent This Summer'' (with Musica36 artists)

Filmography

Personal life 
The artist prefers not to talk about his personal life and never publishes photos of his family on social networks. However, in the Basta music video for the song "Sansara" in April 2017 viewers saw a photo of Skriptonit with a baby in his arms. The rapper later confirmed that on January 19, 2016, he had a son who was named Luchi (after the artist's own mother). The baby's mother was a dancer and choreographer, Nigora Abdiganieva, whom Adil met long before he became famous, and had been in a relationship with for several years.

Abdiganieva appears as 'Nigora' in the video Это ЮГ ('This is the South') with the rapper Aidan recorded in 2012. She raps and dances on the track Джага with B. Jigga and Davinci. She also walks on at the end of the video Вверх ('Up') by the Kazakh rapper HIRO, also 2012. She can be seen in the video invitation Skriptonit at the Green Theater.

In his interview with Yuri Dud the rapper said that after the birth of his son, he moved his family from Kazakhstan to Moscow. However, Abdiganieva decided to return to her native Shymkent with the baby and started working in a dance studio again. The rapper has repeatedly noted that he works very hard, so he rarely comes to his homeland and to see his son.

Awards and nominations 
 Winner of the award "Man of the Year GQ 2016" in the category "Discovery of the Year".
 Winner of "The Real MusicBox Award" in the "Out of Format" category in 2016
 Winner of Apple Music Awards' Artist of the Year (Russia).

References

External links

21st-century Kazakhstani male singers
Russian rappers